Whittington Low Level railway station is a disused station and was one of two former railway stations in the village of Whittington, Shropshire, England.

History
Whittington Low Level was a minor station on the GWR's Paddington to Birkenhead main line. Today this is part of the Shrewsbury to Chester Line. An automatic level crossing lies just to the north of the old station site.

In 1924 Whittington gained its "Low Level" suffix in order to distinguish it from Whittington High Level on the Oswestry to Whitchurch line of the Cambrian Railways.

Historical services

In 1922 passenger services calling at Whittington Low Level were at their most intensive:

 On Sundays two Down (northbound) trains called:
 On Mondays to Saturdays five Down trains called:
 two stopping trains which continued beyond Wrexham to Chester.
 there were only four Up workings, three to Shrewsbury and one going through to Birmingham Snow Hill.

Local goods traffic remained significant until the expansion in road haulage from the 1950s. According to the Official Handbook of Stations the following classes of traffic were being handled at this station in 1956: G, P, F, H & C and there was a one-ton crane.

References

Notes

Sources

Further reading

External links
 Whittington (Shropshire) stations on old O.S. map: via old-maps

Disused railway stations in Shropshire
Former Great Western Railway stations
Railway stations in Great Britain opened in 1848
Railway stations in Great Britain closed in 1960